Emanuel Tanay (March 5, 1928 – August 5, 2014) was a Polish-American physician, a forensic psychiatrist, and a Jewish Holocaust survivor.

Early life

Tanay was born in Wilno, Poland on March 5, 1928, but the family soon moved to Miechów, a small community just north of Kraków. His mother, Betty Tenenwurzel, was both a physician and dentist and his father, Bunim Tenenwurzel, was a dentist.
He survived by being hidden in the Catholic monastery of Mogila in Kraków, Poland.<ref>"The Religious roots of the Holocaust," Emannuel Tanay, in Holocaust scholars write to the Vatican," Harry J. Cargas, ed., Greenwood Publishing Group, 1998, pp. 85. ff.</ref>

In 1943 Tanay escaped from occupied Poland with his mother and sister to Slovakia and then Hungary. They were liberated in January 1945 in Budapest.  He immigrated to the United States after World War II.  He did his psychiatric residency at Elgin State Hospital in Elgin, Illinois.

Career

Tanay was Clinical Professor of Psychiatry at the Wayne State University Medical School in Detroit, Michigan. Emanuel Tanay on LinkedIn (public page)

Death
Tanay died on August 5, 2014, following a lengthy battle with prostate cancer. He was 86.

Books

 American Legal Injustice: Behind the Scenes with an Expert Witness. 2010, Jason Aronson.
 Passport to Life: Autobiographical Reflections on the Holocaust. 2004, Forensic Press.
 The Murderers:'' 1976, Bobbs-Merrill.

Hoax
A fictional report "A German's View on Islam" falsely attributed to Dr. Tanay is often quoted in relation to Islamist terrorism.

External links

References

Holocaust survivors
20th-century Polish Jews
Polish emigrants to the United States
American forensic psychiatrists
1928 births
2014 deaths
Deaths from prostate cancer